The Oliver and Lucy Bonnell Gothic Arch Roofed Barn in Park County, Montana, or simply the Bonnell Barn, is a Gothic-arch barn which was built in 1922.  It was listed on the National Register of Historic Places in 2004.

It was deemed notable as "an excellent and rare example" of a Gothic arched-roof barn, the only one in Park County and one of only 10 known in Montana.

It has a hay hood.

References

Gothic-arch barns
Buildings and structures completed in 1922
National Register of Historic Places in Park County, Montana
Barns on the National Register of Historic Places in Montana
[[Category:Barns with hay hoods{]